Belich is the name of:

Camilla Belich, New Zealand lawyer and politician
James Belich (historian) (born 1956), New Zealand historian
Sir Jim Belich (1927–2015), mayor of Wellington
T. James Belich (born 1976), playwright, also known by pseudonym of Colorado Tolston

See also
Belić